The Committee of 100 is a 501(c)(3) organization of Chinese Americans in business, government, academia and the arts whose stated aim is "to encourage constructive relations between the peoples of the United States and Greater China." It was founded in 1990 by I. M. Pei. Its current chair is H. Roger Wang, chairman and former chief executive officer (CEO) of the Golden Eagle International Group, and its current president is Zhengyu Huang.

Background
The declared key functions of the committee are to serve as a bridge between the cultures and systems of China and America and also to provide a forum for those issues that Americans of Chinese descent face in bettering their lives in the United States. The committee aims to serve as cultural ambassadors and to foster the exchange of ideas and various perspectives among its membership with those in the community and government. Committee delegations have been invited to give briefings to top officials at the White House and Zhongnanhai. The committee has been noted to avoid criticism of the Chinese Communist Party and its policies. A 2018 report by the Hoover Institution and a 2020 Newsweek report noted that committee members have been targets of United Front Work Department pressure and influence operations.

Membership 

The membership, as of October 2020, is as follows, where each name is followed by the member's date of election in parentheses:
 Chi-Foon Chan, President & co-CEO of Synopsys (2010)
 Ed Chan, Vice Chair of Charoen Pokphand Group (2002)
 Ronnie Chan, Chair of Hang Lung Properties (1998)
 Tony F. Chan, President of Hong Kong University of Science and Technology (2010)
 David C. Chang, Prof. emeritus of the Polytechnic Institute of New York University (1996)
 Gareth C.C. Chang, chair and Managing Partner of GC3 & Associates International (1992)
 Gordon H. Chang, Prof. of American History, Olive H. Palmer Professor in Humanities, Stanford University (2015) 
 Morris Chang, Chair of Taiwan Semiconductor Manufacturing (2005)
 Ernest Sho-Hua Liu, American securities analyst and former managing director, Goldman, Sachs & Company (1990-1992)
 Albert Chao, President and CEO, Westlake Chemical Corporation (2014)
 Daniel K.H. Chao, Senior VP, TerraPower (2001)
 Wing T. Chao, Former Vice Chair, Walt Disney Parks and Resorts; Exec. VP, Walt Disney Imagineering
 Micheline Chau, Former President & COO, Lucasfilm (2011)  
 Guoqing Chen, Vice Chair & CEO, Pacific American Corp. (2011)
 Joan Chen, actress (2005)
 John S. Chen, CEO of BlackBerry Ltd (1997)
 Lanhee Chen, David and Diane Steffy Research Fellow, Hoover Institution (2015)
 Lily Lee Chen, Former Vice Chair, Asia Pacific – USA Chamber of Commerce (1990)
 Pehong Chen, CEO & President of Broadvision, Inc. (1994)
 Steve Chen, co-founder of YouTube (2007)
 Anla Cheng, Founder & CEO of SupChina Inc. (2005)
 Mei-Wei Cheng, Chairman of Pactera Technology Ltd. (1996)
 Richard T. Cheng, Chairman of JRC, LLC (1994)
 Andrew Cherng, Founder, chair and Co-CEO of Panda Restaurant Group (2000)
 John Chiang, California State Controller (2000)
 Leroy Chiao, astronaut (2006)
 Anne Chow, President, Integrator Solutions, AT&T Global Business (2010)
 David Chu, Founder of Nautica (1996)
 J. Michael Chu, Global Co-CEO of L Catterton (2002)
 Morgan Chu, Partner at Irell & Manella (2015)
 Paul C. W. Chu, physicist (1991)
 Wilson Chu, Partner at McDermott Will & Emery (1999)
 Weili Dai, President and co-founder of Marvell Technology Group (2010)
 Nelson Dong, Partner at Dorsey & Whitney (1991)
 Tan Dun, classical composer and conductor (2001)
 Julie Fong, Film Producer at Partizan (2000)
 Kenneth Fong, Chairman of Kenson Ventures, LLC (1997)
 Michael Fung, Interim CFO and COO of Neiman Marcus (2007)
 Buck Gee, board member of Angel Island Immigration Station Foundation (2015)
 Harry Gee, Jr., Principal of Harry Gee & Associates (1999)
 Robert W. Gee, President, Gee Strategy Group (1999)
 David Ho, AIDS researcher (1990)
 Ming Hsieh, founder of Cogent Systems (2008)
 Douglas Hsu, chairman and CEO, Far Eastern Group (2005)
 Ming Chen Hsu, Director of J. T. Tai & Co. Foundation (1990)
 Lucy Liu, actress (2004)
 Ta-lin Hsu, chair and Founder of H&Q Asia Pacific (2010)
 Yue-Sai Kan, television host and producer (1990)
 Clarence Kwan, Senior Advisor of Sino-Century China Overseas Investment Partners (2006)
 Stewart Kwoh, President and Exec. Director, Asian Americans Advancing Justice - Los Angeles (1999)
 Shau-wai Lam, Chairman emeritus at DCH Auto Group (2020)
 Handel Lee, senior partner at King & Wood Mallesons (2007)
 Richard Y. Lee, chairman and CEO of Amsino Medical Group (2011)
 Robert Lee, chairman of the board, Blue Shield of California (1991)
 Cheng Li, Director & Senior Fellow, John L. Thornton China Center, The Brookings Institution (2006)
 Ge Li, Founder, chairman and CEO of WuXi AppTec Co., Ltd. (2010)
 Herman Y. Li, Chairman of C+L Restaurant Group (2000)
 Howard Li, chairman, CEO and Founder of Waitex International Co., Ltd (2006)
 James M. Li, managing director (retired) of Goldman Sachs (1993)
 Jeffrey Li, Chairman & CEO of GL Capital Group (2008)
 Li Lu, Founder and Chairman of Himalaya Capital (2011)
 Shu Li, Chairman of J&J Investments (2010)
 Maya Lin, architect (2004)
 Michael C. Lin, Former executive director, Organization of Chinese Americans (1999)
 Paul C. Lin, Partner-In-Charge of Akin Gump Strauss Hauer & Feld (2010)
 Betty Liu, Anchor, Bloomberg Television (2014)
 Deborah Liu, Vice President, Facebook (2020)
 Don Liu, Professor and Senior Advisor, Department of Ophthalmology, University of Missouri (1990)
 Ida Liu, Regional Head - North America, Citibank (2020)
 Norman Liu, President & CEO of GE Capital Aviation Services (1999)
 Peter Liu, Chairman of WI Harper Group (1998)
 Gary Locke, former U.S. Ambassador to China (2016)
 Lawrence Low, Chief Legal Officer of Orrick (1995)
 Weiming Lu, Urban Planning and Development Advisor (2014)
 Richard Lui, Journalist and News Anchor, MSNBC and NBC News (2020)
 Lesley Ma, VP, Chief Information and Continuous Improvement Officer, NSF International (2020)
 Philip Ma, VP of Digital Health Technology & Data Sciences, Biogen (2010)
 Yo-Yo Ma, cellist (1989)
 Adeline Yen Mah, writer and physician (1992)
 Wan Ling Martello, EVP, Head of Zone Asia, Oceania and Africa, Nestle (2007)
 Yu (Ben) Meng, Chief Investment Officer, CalPERS (2020)
 Matthew F.C. Miau, Chairman of MiTAC-SYNNEX Group (2005)
 Jenny Ming, CEO & President, Charlotte Russe (clothing retailer) (2001)
 Anna W. Mok, Partner, National Regions Leader, Deloitte & Touche LLP (2010)
 X. Rick Niu, President & CEO of Starr Strategic Holdings LLC, (2017)
 Dominic Ng, chair and CEO of East West Bank (2000) 
 Chien Chung (Didi) Pei, Founding Partner of Pei Partnership Architects, (2017)
 Edmond Pi, Professor Emeritus of Clinical Psychiatry and the Behavioral Sciences, Keck School of Medicine of USC (1991)
 John J. Sie, former executive at Starz Inc. (1997)
 Anthony Sun, Former Managing General Partner and CEO, Venrock Inc., Rockefeller Family and Associates	(2002)
 Brian Sun, partner of Norton Rose Fulbright (2001)
 Jackson Tai, Independent Director, HSBC Holdings PLC, Eli Lilly and Company, MasterCard, Royal Philips NV, Canada Private Pension Investment Board (1997)
 Lip-Bu Tan, chairman, President and CEO of Walden International, Cadence Design Systems (2001)
 Yuanyuan Tan, principal dancer with San Francisco Ballet (2010)
 David K.Y. Tang, Managing Partner, Asia, K&L Gates (1996)
 Henry S. Tang, Managing Partner of Carnegie Towers Strategic Investment Advisory (1989)
 Oscar Tang, President of Tang Fund (1989)
 Hao Jiang Tian, opera singer for the Metropolitan Opera (2006)
 Shao Kuang Ting, artist at Ting Shao Kuang Fine Arts (1996)
 Chiling Tong, President & CEO of Asian/Pacific Islander American Chamber of Commerce and Entrepreneurship (ACE) (2018)
 Timothy W. Tong, President of the Hong Kong Polytechnic University (2011)
 Maeley Tom, Former Chief Administrative Officer (CAO) of California State Assembly, (2020)
 Ming Tsai, television personality and chef (2010)
 Calvin Tsao, Principal of Tsao & McKown Architects (2002)
 Carter Tseng, chairman and CEO of Little Dragon Foundation (2003)
 Wei-ming Tu, Professor at Peking University and Professor & Distinguished Scholar of Asia Center at Harvard University (2000)
 Mei-Mei Tuan, managing director and co-founder of Notch Partners (2013)
 Savio Tung, Chairman of Investcorp Technology Partners (1998)
 Charles P. Wang, President of Chinese American Cultural & Art Association (1989)
 Cher Wang, co-founder and chairperson HTC Corporation (2010)
 Chi Wang, Co-chair of the U.S.-China Policy Foundation (1999)
 Dazong Wang, Chairman	of Ophoenix Capital Management (2010)
 Roger Wang, chair and CEO of Golden Eagle International Group (2007)
 Lulu C. Wang, chief executive officer of Tupelo Capital Management, LLC (1993)
 Stanley Wang, President of Pantronix Corporation (1997)
 Ted T. Wang, CIO of Puissance Capital Management	(2011)
 Walter Wang, President and CEO of JM Eagle (1999)
 William Wang, CEO & Founder of Vizio (2010)
 Andrea Wong, executive at Sony Pictures Television and Sony Pictures Entertainment (2010)
 Leslie E. Wong, President of San Francisco State University (2015) 
 Charlie Woo, CEO of Megatoys (2000)
 Benjamin Wu, Vice Chair of US-Asia Institute (2006)
 Dennis Wu, Managing Partner of WuHoover & Co. LLP (1992)
 Frank H. Wu, Distinguished Professor, University of California, Hastings College of the Law (2002)
 Jeremy Wu, Senior Advisor (retired) of U.S. Census Bureau (2003)
 Ken Xie, founder of Fortinet and NetScreen (2010)
 Jay Xu, Director and CEO of Asian Art Museum of San Francisco (2010)
 Dali Yang, Professor at the University of Chicago (2011)
 Shirley Wang, Founder and chief executive officer, Plastpro Inc.,(2020)
 Brian A Wong, Vice President - Global Initiatives, Alibaba Group, (2020)
 Debra Wong Yang, former U.S. Attorney for the Central District of California (2007)
 Geoffrey Y. Yang, managing director of Redpoint Ventures (1998)
 Henry T. Yang, chancellor of the University of California, Santa Barbara (2006)
 Janet Yang, Hollywood producer (1998)
 Jerry Yang, co-founder and former CEO of Yahoo! (1997)
 Linda Tsao Yang, Chair Emeritus of Asian Corporate Governance Association (1998)
 Alice Young, Founder of Alice Young Advisory LLC (1994)
 Peter Young, President & Managing Director of Young & Partners, (2017)
 Shirley Young, chair, US-China Cultural Institute (1989)
 Pauline Yu, scholar of Chinese literature and president of the American Council of Learned Societies (2007)
 Nancy Yuan, Vice President and Director of The Asia Foundation – Washington (2006)
 Teddy Zee, producer (2007)
 Ya-Qin Zhang, President of Baidu (2008)
 Eric Zheng, Chairman of Heng An Standard Life Insurance Company Limited, (2020)

Former members 

 Zheng Cao, Chinese American Mezzo-soprano
 Iris Chang, Chinese American Historian and Journalist
 Anna Chennault, writer, lecturer, international business executive, and Chairman of the Council for International Cooperation (CIC)
 Matt Fong, Former California State Treasurer
 John Liu Fugh, United States Army Major General and Judge Advocate General of the U.S. Army (2001, d. 2010)
 I. M. Pei, architect (1989), founder of the organization
 William W. Shaw, leading plastic surgeon
 Charlie Sie, Chairman of Aviva Systems Biology

 Cyrus Tang, CEO & Chairman of Tang Industries, Inc.
 Kung-Lee Wang, Founder of Organization of Chinese Americans (OCA)
 Chien-Shiung Wu, Chinese American Experimental Physicist and Founder, Committee of 100
 Albert Yu, Chairman of One Angstrom
 Y.C. Yang, prominent structural engineer
 John Young, distinguished professor at Georgetown University
 Ernest Sho-Hua Liu, Securities Analyst and managing director, Goldman, Sachs & Co. (retired)

See also 

 US-China Business Council

References

External links 
 

Chinese-American organizations